For the French politician, see Michel Pezet.

Jan Paweł Kapliński (born April 18, 1980), better known by his stage name Pezet, is a Polish rapper. In 1998, he debuted with Onar in Płomień 81 and they released three albums. He started working with Noon in 2002, publishing two albums. Five years later in 2007 his first solo album hit the stores.

Pezet hosted the program Rap Fura on Viva. He also had an episode in a crime drama television series called Kryminalni on TVN. Paweł has a brother who is also a rapper, better known as Małolat.

Discography

References

1980 births
Living people
Rappers from Warsaw